{{Infobox television
|genre=Comedy showSketch show
|creator=David WalliamsDawson Bros.
|starring=
|country=United Kingdom
|language=English
|num_episodes=7 <small>|company=BBC
|network=BBC One
|first_aired=
|last_aired=
|num_series=1 (and 1 pilot)
|runtime=40 minutes (pilot)  30 minutes (series)
}}Walliams & Friend is a British sketch show, produced by and starring David Walliams, airing on BBC One with a debut pilot special on 24 December 2015. A full-length first series of 6 episodes was commissioned on 20 May 2016, which first aired on 25 November 2016.

 Production 
It was previously called The David Walliams Sketch Show until September 2015.

Filming for the pilot episode for Walliams & Friend'' began on 19 September 2015 at The London Studios.  Further filming took place either later in that same year or sometime in 2016.

Episodes

Pilot episode (2015)

Series 1 (2016)

Reception 
The Times described the show as "Exceptionally accomplished, with every sketch sharply observed and superbly performed", while The Independent made similar comparisons: "Worthy of Messrs Barker and Corbett at their best". The Guardian noted that the show "Thrives on charm and silliness and points a way for the sketch show to continue to exist on television". The Sunday People declared "The good old sketch show is back." while The Daily Telegraph said "David Walliams goes back to basics here with a series of comedy sketches that will remind many why they first found him funny.". However, later in the show's run, The Times's Andrew Billen predicted of the sketch genre that "Even Harry Enfield and David Walliams couldn't save the sketch show".

References

External links
 
 
 

David Walliams
2010s British television sketch shows
2015 British television series debuts
2016 British television series endings
BBC television sketch shows
English-language television shows